Çağlarca  (formerly Suntras) is a  village in Toroslar district of Mersin Province, Turkey,  where the capital city of Toroslar district is actually a part of Greater Mersin. The name of the village refers to a small waterfall within the village. The origin of the former name is not known. Although it is claimed that it is a corrupted form of  Saint Iras, no document supports this claim. It is a picturesque mountain village and famous for its trout restaurants and kiwi fruit. The population of Çağlarca was 306 as of 2012.

References

Villages in Toroslar District